Bernhard Ludvik (born 21 June 1961) is a Specialist in Internal Medicine, board certified in Endocrinology and Metabolism. He is currently an Associate Professor of Medicine at the Medical University of Vienna. He serves as the Deputy Head of the Division of Endocrinology and Metabolism at the General Hospital Vienna (AKH-Allgemeines Krankenhaus).

Education and career 
Bernhard Ludvik was born in Vienna in 1961. He attended the Medical School at the University of Vienna and graduated as Doctor of Medicine ( M.D.) in 1985. After his internship and residency from 1985 to 1992 at the Medical Department II, University of Vienna, he was a research fellow at the University of California, San Diego for 2 years and was appointed Associate Professor at the Medical University of Vienna the following year. Bernhard Ludvik is a specialist in Internal Medicine and board certified in Endocrinology and Metabolism since 1996. Since 2009 he is the Deputy-Head of the Division of Endocrinology and Metabolism and the acting head of the Diabetes Outpatient Clinic at the Department of Internal Medicine III, University of Vienna (Vienna General Hospital).

Current functions (2011)
Immediate Past President of the Austrian Diabetes Organisation and Past President of the Austrian Obesity Association
 Section editor (for the section: Clinical Aspects and Treatment) Obesity Facts - The European Journal of Obesity
 Advisory Board of the Austrian Obesity Association
 Member of the Editorial Board and Editor in Chief of "Journal für Ernährungsmedizin“
 Member of the Scientific Committee of the IFSO (International Federation for the Surgery of Obesity)

Honors and awards
 Research grant "Erste Österreichische Sparkasse“ (1992)
 Fellowship of the Max Kade Foundation; Research fellow at the University of San Diego, California (1992-1994)
 Hoechst Award (1995)
 1st Secretary of the Federation of the International DONAU-SYMPOSIA on Diabetes mellitus (1996-1999)
 Assistant Editor of DIABETOLOGIA (1998-2003)
 Chairman of the European Congress on Obesity (ECO) Vienna, Austria (2001)
 Founding Fellow of the SCOPE program (EASO) (2004)
 2nd Secretary of the Austrian Society of Internal Medicine (2005)

Scientific interest and research highlights 
 Research in obesity, metabolic syndrome and diabetes, more than 95 peer-reviewed publications in high ranked journals, reviewer in top journals, successful application for research grants, organisation of national and international meetings
 Basic research on the pathogenesis and therapy of type 2 diabetes, the metabolic syndrome and obesity
 Clinical research on the treatment of obesity, diabetes and lipid metabolism as the principal investigator of numerous studies and clinical trials
 Nutritional Medicine
 Original contributions in many top journals, review articles, book contributions, numerous presentations at national and international congresses, organization of national and international congresses, referent at training events, reviews in top journals (Diabetes Care, Diabetologia, European Journal of Clinical Investigation)

Memberships 
 Austrian Society of Internal Medicine
 Austrian Diabetes Association
 Austrian Obesity Association
 Austrian Society of Endocrinology
 American Diabetes Association
 European Association for the Study of Obesity (EASO)
 European Association for the Study of Diabetes (EASD)
 European Group on Insulin Resistance (EGIR)
 Federation of International Donau Symposia on Diabetes mellitus

Original papers and reviews (selection)

Books 
 Ludvik B (Ed.): Risikofaktor Diabetes – Konzepte für ein Langzeitproblem. Uni-Med-Verlag Bremen, 1.Aufl. 2004 
 Mihaljevic K, Feffer S, Ludvik B: Essen mit Spass + Aktivsein mit Mass. So entkommen Sie dem Metabolischen Syndrom, Verlagshaus der Ärzte, 1. Aufl. 2006 
 Pfeiffer A, Ludvik B, Kinzl JF: Für immer dünn. [Audio CD - Hörbuch], Galila Hörbuchverlag, 1.Aufl. 2006 
 Prager R, Abrahamian H, Kautzky-Willer A, Ludvik B, Schütz-Fuhrmann I, Weitgasser R: Diabetesmanagement mit Insulinanaloga. UNI-MED Verlag AG, 1. Auflage, 2008

References

Further reading
 https://web.archive.org/web/20110905101405/http://www.bernhard-ludvik.at/en/infopdata.html
 
 http://www.diabetesnw.at/pdf/CV_Ludvik.pdf
 http://www.adipositas-austria.org/ueber_uns.html
 https://web.archive.org/web/20100126182440/http://www.diabetesincrisis.net/module3-2.html
 http://www.planetark.com/dailynewsstory.cfm/newsid/24169/story.htm
 http://www.nutraingredients.com/Research/Japanese-vegetable-extract-offers-promise-for-diabetes-control
 http://www.prweb.com/releases/metacure/interventional-diabetolog/prweb5099964.htm

External links
 Personal website (English version)

Living people
1961 births
Austrian diabetologists
University of Vienna alumni
Physicians from Vienna